This is a list of feature-length films of the Tom and Jerry franchise.

Theatrical films

Direct-to-video films
All direct-to-video films are produced by Turner Entertainment and Warner Bros. Animation.

Tom and Jerry: The Magic Ring

Tom and Jerry: Blast Off to Mars

Tom and Jerry: The Fast and the Furry
After their house gets destroyed during a wild goose chase, Tom and Jerry discover a racetrack that sends them around the world. Wanting to be the one to win the gold medal, Tom joins the race but not aware that Jerry has made his own tiny race car. Tom attempts to win the race but Jerry uses a few pranks of his own making him lose the first race. Deciding to beat Jerry for good, Tom uses a bigger race car of his own that speeds around the world that drags Jerry along.

Tom and Jerry: Shiver Me Whiskers

Tom and Jerry: A Nutcracker Tale

Tom and Jerry Meet Sherlock Holmes
In this film, Tom and Jerry work together with Sherlock Holmes to stop Professor Moriarty from stealing the Crown Jewels during a solar eclipse.

 Voice cast
 Spike Brandt (uncredited) as Tom Cat and Jerry Mouse
 Michael York as Sherlock Holmes
 Malcolm McDowell as Professor Moriarty
 John Rhys-Davies as Dr. Watson
 Grey DeLisle as Red
 Kath Soucie as Tuffy
 Jeff Bergman as Butch and Droopy
 Phil LaMarr as Spike and Policeman
 Greg Ellis as Tin and Sergeant
 Jess Harnell as Pan and Brett Jeremy
 Richard McGonagle as Alley and First Policeman
 Tom Kenny as various characters

Tom and Jerry and The Wizard of Oz
Tom and Jerry and the Wizard of Oz is an animated adaptation of the 1939 Metro-Goldwyn-Mayer film The Wizard of Oz (which in turn is based on the 1900 novel The Wonderful Wizard of Oz by L. Frank Baum), with the addition of Tom and Jerry as characters and told through their point of view. The film was released on DVD and Blu-ray on August 23, 2011, by Warner Home Video. Common Sense Media rated the film 3 out of 5 stars.

Voice cast 
 Spike Brandt (uncredited) as Tom Cat, Jerry Mouse
 Grey DeLisle as Dorothy Gale (Nikki Yanofsky provides Dorothy's singing voice)
 Joe Alaskey as Professor Marvel / The Wizard (the former having only a cameo at the end of the film), Butch, Droopy
 Michael Gough as Hunk / The Scarecrow
 Rob Paulsen as Hickory / The Tin Man
 Todd Stashwick as Zeke / The Cowardly Lion
 Frances Conroy as Aunt Em, Glinda 
 Laraine Newman as Miss Almira Gulch / The Wicked Witch of the West
 Stephen Root as Uncle Henry, Crows
 Kath Soucie as Tuffy the Munchkin Mouse / Tuffy the Country Mouse

Tom and Jerry: Robin Hood and His Merry Mouse

Tom and Jerry's Giant Adventure

Tom and Jerry: The Lost Dragon

Tom and Jerry: Spy Quest

Tom and Jerry: Back to Oz
Tom and Jerry: Back to Oz is a 2016 fantasy comedy direct-to-video sequel to Tom and Jerry and the Wizard of Oz. In the film, Tom and Jerry team up with Dorothy and her friends as they return to the Land of Oz to stop a new villain, the Nome King, from taking over Emerald City. This movie was dedicated to voice artist Joe Alaskey who appears in his final film role after his death in February 2016.

 Voice cast
 Grey Griffin as Dorothy Gale
 Jason Alexander as The Nome King (Mr. Bibb)
 Amy Pemberton as Dorothy's singing voice and The Mouse Queen
 Joe Alaskey as The Wizard of Oz, Butch, Droopy
 Michael Gough as The Scarecrow (Hunk)
 Rob Paulsen as The Tin Man (Hickory)
 Todd Stashwick as The Cowardly Lion (Zeke)
 Frances Conroy as Auntie Em and Glinda
 Laraine Newman as The Wicked Witch of the West
 Stephen Root as Uncle Henry
 Kath Soucie as Tuffy the Munchkin Mouse, Tractor
 Andrea Martin as The Hungry Tiger
 James Monroe Iglehart as Jitterbug (Calvin Carney)
 Spike Brandt as Tom Cat, Jerry Mouse (uncredited), Spike

 Reception
Renee Schonfeld of Common Sense Media rated it 3 out of 5 stars, saying "By blending solid new musical numbers with the old Oz favorites and including inventive new characters, Spike Brandt, Tony Cerone, and company have made this sequel funny and original."

Tom and Jerry: Willy Wonka and the Chocolate Factory

Tom and Jerry: Cowboy Up!

Tom and Jerry: Snowman's Land

Appearances in other films

References

Tom and Jerry
American film series